Ghar Ho To Aisa is a 1990 Indian Hindi-language drama film directed by Kalpataru and produced by Firoz Nadiadwala. It stars Anil Kapoor and Meenakshi Seshadri in pivotal roles. The film was remade in Telugu as Attintlo Adde Mogudu. The popular pairing of Anil Kapoor and Meenakshi Sheshadri, which was featured in many films was much appreciated. Sheshadri's performance in particular as the feisty daughter-in-law who teaches her cruel in-laws a lesson was loved by audiences; providing a great contrast to Deepti Neval character; as the meek oppressed daughter-in-law. Bindu played her trade mark negative mother-in-law character with great conviction.  The film was a box office success.

Cast
 Anil Kapoor as Amar 
 Meenakshi Seshadri as Seema
 Raj Kiran as Vijay 
 Deepti Naval as Sharda  
 Bindu as Durga 
 Saeed Jaffrey as Ram Prasad 
 Kader Khan as Bajrangi 
 Om Prakash as Karamchand
 Javed Rizvi Jarehavi as Bajrangi's son
 Rita Bhaduri as Kanchan
 Sonika Gill as Sona 
 Satyen Kappu as Dwarka Prasad
 Urmila Bhatt as Neeta's Mother-in-law
 Jayshree T. as Neeta
 Sulbha Deshpande as Devki
 Chandrashekar as Doctor       
 Mahesh Anand as Goon 
 Dinesh Hingoo as Charity Show Organizer 
 Mahavir Shah as Prince

Plot
The Kumar family consists of Ramprasad and his wife Durga. Their married son is Vijay, his wife Sharda and daughter Pinky. They also have a married daughter Kanchan whose husband Bajrangi is a gharjamai. Amar is their bachelor and unemployed son.

The movie opens with the dysfunctional Kumar family, where most of its members are highly greedy, lazy, selfish and abusive. Durga is a short-tempered, aggressive woman who physically and verbally abuses her daughter in law, Sharada, for every minor reason and belittles her for her poverty. Her elder son, Vijay follows her footsteps and is insensitive and abusive towards his wife and daughter. Durga's lazy daughter, Kanchan, is just like her mother and falsely accuses Sharada of being lazy, which results in the latter getting beaten up. Kanchan is also highly domineering over her husband, Bajrangi, who does the housework. Ramprasad is a henpecked man. Sharada is a meek woman and respects her family, but nobody appreciates her work. Bajrangi is a simple and innocent man from a rural area and is not so intelligent, though he has sympathy for Sharada.

The only member in the family who is truly good at heart and who actually cares for Sharada is Amar, Vijay's younger brother. Amar is an unemployed youth who is honest, kind and helpful, going as far as to beat up pickpockets to help an old woman. During his quest for a job, he runs into Seema, the only daughter of a rich businessman who hates men and their domineering ways. Seema runs an NGO for the welfare of women, though Amar criticizes her for her biased hatred towards men.

Seema's father, Karamchand forces her to get married or else he would commit suicide. Seema tries to involve Amar in a false contract marriage and entices him with money. Amar is outraged and flatly refuses her offer.

Karamchand secretly overhears the entire exchange. Though disappointed with Seema, he is impressed with Amar's honest conduct and appoints him as the manager of his cycle factory. He also asks Amar to convince his daughter that not all men are domineering. Amar begins his successful career as a factory manager, earning Karamchand's trust and Seema's irritation.

Meanwhile, Durga asks Amar to enter in an engagement with and eventually marry Sona, the only daughter of an industrialist, as he offers a dowry of Rs 1 million. Amar belittles his mother's greed and dismisses her idea. Durga demands Rs 10,000 from Sharada. Sharada pleads with her hard, but Durga is relentless and has her thrown out of the house. Sharada's mother, living in poverty finds out about her daughter's situation and succumbs to pressure. Sharada protests to Durga, but Durga kicks her and Pinky out of the house.

A few days later, Amar is devastated when he finds out that Sharada and Pinky died in a roadside accident. Nevertheless, the family is apathetic towards these deaths and nonchalantly ask Vijay to enter into an engagement with Sona. Vijay complies, much to Amar's disgust.

One day, Seema asks Amar to come to her house, so that she can explain her hatred for men. She shows Amar a mother and daughter and tells him how they were kicked out of the house by their greedy family. They are revealed to be Sharada and Pinky and Amar is overjoyed upon seeing them.

Sharada tells Amar that two mentally challenged women wearing their clothes had actually died in the accident. Seema was Sharada's childhood friend and had rescued her and her daughter. Amar is enraged and vows revenge against his toxic family. Karamchand suggests Amar and Seema pretend as a married couple and exact revenge on the Kumars, to which both agree.

Amar and Seema enter the Kumar household as a married couple. Durga tries to slap Seema, but the latter grabs her hand and overpowers her, causing everyone to fear her. Seema gradually brings order to the house by forcing and blackmailing Kanchan, Durga, and Ramprasad to perform all household tasks. Amar appoints Bajrangi in his office and gives him a good salary. Durga tries to put Seema's hand in boiling water, but it backfires on her. Kanchan gives up her ego and learns to respect Bajrangi and they live happily.

Meanwhile, Vijay is disgusted with Sona's gallivanting with so many men and her arrogance. She makes him remove her shoes, reminding Vijay of the way he treated Sharada and feels humiliated. Sona compares his loyalty to that of a dog, which causes Vijay to break the engagement. Vijay is deeply remorseful for being abusive towards his wife and daughter. He is overjoyed when he discovers Sharada and Pinky are alive and begs Sharada for forgiveness. Learning the whole story from Sharada, Vijay returns home and declares that he is leaving his parents forever to live with his wife and daughter. He thanks Amar for opening his eyes.

Bajrangi decides to leave home, to start a new life and his wife and son follow him as well. Durga begs Amar to stay, but Amar also tells his intent to leave. He further harshly criticises his mother of her toxic behavior and how much harm she had caused to the family.

Filled with guilt, Durga decides to immolate herself, but her sons prevent her from doing so. Durga weeps and begs Sharada for forgiveness and asks her children to not to desert her. Karamchand arrives and reveals the Kumars about Amar's ploy.

Karamchand asks Seema to leave. Seema, who has fallen in love with Amar, becomes angry with his lack of action and drags him to his room, locking it. Seema angrily asks Amar why he was not stopping her from going with her father. She further starts hurling things at Amar and bursts into tears. Amar tells Seema about his love and reconciles with her.

Soundtrack
All lyrics are written by Majrooh Sultanpuri.

References

External links

1990s Hindi-language films
1990 films
Films scored by Bappi Lahiri
Hindi films remade in other languages
Films directed by Kalpataru